Sultan Mohamed el-Jameel Sri Bavana Sooja Mahaa Radun (Dhivehi: އައްސުލޠާން މުޙައްމަދުލް ޖަމީލް ސިރީ ބަވަނަ ސޫޖާ މަހާރަދުން) was consort of Queen Khadijah of Maldives. He ascended the throne in 1363 by forcing his wife (Queen Khadijah) to abdicate. Before his succession he was the vizier of his wife. Sultan Jameel was assassinated by his wife in 1364 to regain her throne.

1364 deaths
14th-century sultans of the Maldives
Year of birth unknown